This is a list of the 81 members of the European Parliament for Italy in the 1984 to 1989 session.

List

Party representation

References

1984
List
Italy